Major General Richard Matthew McQueen Sykes CVO (born 1955) is a retired senior British Army officer. From 2010 to 2014 he was Group Chief Executive of Elizabeth Finn Care, a large charity providing relief from poverty in the UK.  A former British Army officer, his military career culminated as Assistant Chief of Defence Staff (Personnel) in the UK Ministry of Defence.  At the same he served as the Defence Services Secretary from 2007 to 2010 in the Royal Household. He is currently Chief Executive of the Sir Simon Milton Foundation.

Military career
Sykes was commissioned into the Royal Artillery in 1976. He became Commanding Officer of 3rd Regiment Royal Horse Artillery in 1994. He went on to be Strategic Policy Chief at NATO's Supreme Headquarters Allied Powers Europe in 1997, Chief Co-ordinator of Joint Firepower for the Allied Rapid Reaction Corps in 2000 and Director of Corporate Communications for the Army at the Ministry of Defence in 2002. After that he became Director Royal Artillery in 2005 and then Defence Services Secretary in 2007 as well as Assistant Chief of Defence Staff (Personnel) from 2009 before retiring from the Army in 2010. He served on operations in Northern Ireland, Bosnia-Herzegovina and Kosovo.  During his time as Defence Services Secretary, he was responsible for the introduction of the Elizabeth Cross awarded to families of the British Armed Forces killed in action or as a result of a terrorist attack since the Second World War.

Post military career

After leaving the Army, from 2010 to 2014 he was Group Chief Executive of Elizabeth Finn Care, a British charity helping people in the UK struggling with financial hardship. During the same period he was a non-executive director of Elizabeth Finn Homes Limited, a company owned by the Charity, responsible for the running of 9 care homes and 11 almshouses. 

He is now Chief Executive of the Sir Simon Milton Foundation, a charity based in the City of Westminster helping disadvantaged younger people in training and education and supporting older people, especially those who are lonely and socially isolated.

He holds a number of other executive, non-executive, advisory, consultant and voluntary posts, including Gentleman Usher to  the King and he was Honorary Regimental Colonel of the King's Troop, Royal Horse Artillery. In this capacity he accompanied Margaret Thatcher's coffin to St Paul's Cathedral during her funeral.

References

 

British Army generals
Royal Artillery officers
Living people
British charity and campaign group workers
NATO military personnel
Commanders of the Royal Victorian Order
1955 births